Crucifixion is a method of capital punishment in which the victim is tied or nailed to a large wooden cross or beam and left to hang until eventual death from exhaustion and asphyxiation. It was used as a punishment by the Persians, Carthaginians and Romans, among others. Crucifixion has been used in parts of the world as recently as the twentieth century.

The crucifixion of Jesus of Nazareth is central to Christianity, and the cross (sometimes depicting Jesus nailed to it) is the main religious symbol for many Christian churches.

Terminology

In earlier pre-Roman Greek texts  usually means "impale".

The Greek used in the Christian New Testament uses four verbs, three of them based upon , usually translated "cross". , "to fix or fasten to, impale, crucify" occurs only once at the Acts of the Apostles 2:23.

The English term cross derives from the Latin word , which classically referred to a tree or any construction of wood used to hang criminals as a form of execution. The term later came to refer specifically to a cross.

Detail

Cross shape

The gibbet on which crucifixion was carried out could be of many shapes. Josephus says that the Roman soldiers who crucified the many prisoners taken during the Siege of Jerusalem under Titus diverted themselves by nailing them to the crosses in different ways; and Seneca the Younger recounts: "I see crosses there, not just of one kind but made in many different ways: some have their victims with head down to the ground; some impale their private parts; others stretch out their arms on the gibbet."

At times the gibbet was only one vertical stake, called in Latin crux simplex. This was the simplest available construction for torturing and killing the condemned. Frequently, however, there was a cross-piece attached either at the top to give the shape of a T (crux commissa) or just below the top, as in the form most familiar in Christian symbolism (crux immissa). The most ancient image of a Roman crucifixion depicts an individual on a T-shaped cross. It is a graffito found in a taberna (hostel for wayfarers) in Puteoli, dating to the time of Trajan or Hadrian (late 1st century to early 2nd century AD).

Second-century writers who speak of the execution cross describe the crucified person's arms as outstretched, not attached to a single stake: Lucian speaks of Prometheus as crucified "above the ravine with his hands outstretched". He also says that the shape of the letter T (the Greek letter tau) was that of the wooden instrument used for crucifying. Artemidorus, another writer of the same period, says that a cross is made of posts (plural) and nails and that the arms of the crucified are outstretched. Speaking of the generic execution cross, Irenaeus (c. 130–202), a Christian writer, describes it as composed of an upright and a transverse beam, sometimes with a small projection in the upright.

The New Testament writings about the crucifixion of Jesus do not specify the shape of that cross, but the early writings that do speak of its shape liken it to the letter T. William Barclay notes that, because the letter T is shaped exactly like the crux commissa and because the Greek letter T represented the number 300, "wherever the fathers came across the number 300 in the Old Testament they took it to be a mystical prefiguring of the cross of Christ". The earliest example, possibly of the late first century, is the Epistle of Barnabas. Clement of Alexandria (c. 150 – c. 215) is another early writer who gives the same interpretation of the numeral used for 300. Justin Martyr (c. 100–165) sees the cross of Christ represented in the crossed spits used in roasting the Passover Lamb: "That lamb which was commanded to be wholly roasted was a symbol of the suffering of the cross which Christ would undergo. For the lamb, which is roasted, is roasted and dressed up in the form of the cross. For one spit is transfixed right through from the lower parts up to the head, and one across the back, to which are attached the legs of the lamb."

Nail placement
In popular depictions of the crucifixion of Jesus (possibly because in translations of  the wounds are described as being "in his hands"), Jesus is shown with nails in his hands. But in Greek the word "χείρ", usually translated as "hand", could refer to the entire portion of the arm below the elbow, and to denote the hand as distinct from the arm some other word could be added, as "ἄκρην οὔτασε χεῖρα" (he wounded the end of the χείρ, i.e., "he wounded her in the hand".

A possibility that does not require tying is that the nails were inserted just above the wrist, through the soft tissue, between the two bones of the forearm (the radius and the ulna).

A foot-rest (suppedaneum) attached to the cross, perhaps for the purpose of taking the person's weight off the wrists, is sometimes included in representations of the crucifixion of Jesus but is not discussed in ancient sources. Some scholars interpret the Alexamenos graffito, the earliest surviving depiction of the Crucifixion, as including such a foot-rest. Ancient sources also mention the sedile, a small seat attached to the front of the cross, about halfway down, which could have served a similar purpose.

In 1968, archaeologists discovered at Giv'at ha-Mivtar in northeast Jerusalem the remains of one Jehohanan, who had been crucified in the 1st century. The remains included a heel bone with a nail driven through it from the side. The tip of the nail was bent, perhaps because of striking a knot in the upright beam, which prevented it being extracted from the foot. A first inaccurate account of the length of the nail led some to believe that it had been driven through both heels, suggesting that the man had been placed in a sort of sidesaddle position, but the true length of the nail, 11.5 cm (4.53 inches), suggests instead that in this case of crucifixion the heels were nailed to opposite sides of the upright. The skeleton from Giv'at ha-Mivtar is currently the only confirmed example of ancient crucifixion in the archaeological record. A second set of skeletal remains with holes transverse through the calcaneum heel bones was found in 2007. This could be a second archaeological record of crucifixion. The find in Cambridgeshire (United Kingdom) in November 2017 of the remains of the heel bone of a (probably enslaved) man with an iron nail through it, is believed by the archeologists to confirm the use of this method in ancient Rome.

Cause of death
The length of time required to reach death could range from hours to days depending on method, the victim's health, and the environment. A literature review by Maslen and Mitchell identified scholarly support for several possible causes of death: cardiac rupture, heart failure, hypovolemic shock, acidosis, asphyxia, arrhythmia, and pulmonary embolism. Death could result from any combination of those factors or from other causes, including sepsis following infection due to the wounds caused by the nails or by the scourging that often preceded crucifixion, eventual dehydration, or animal predation.

A theory attributed to Pierre Barbet holds that, when the whole body weight was supported by the stretched arms, the typical cause of death was asphyxiation. He wrote that the condemned would have severe difficulty inhaling, due to hyper-expansion of the chest muscles and lungs. The condemned would therefore have to draw himself up by the arms, leading to exhaustion, or have his feet supported by tying or by a wood block. When no longer able to lift himself, the condemned would die within a few minutes. Some scholars, including Frederick Zugibe, posit other causes of death. Zugibe suspended test subjects with their arms at 60° to 70° from the vertical. The test subjects had no difficulty breathing during experiments, but did suffer rapidly increasing pain, which is consistent with the Roman use of crucifixion to achieve a prolonged, agonizing death. However, Zugibe's positioning of the test subjects' feet is not supported by any archaeological or historical evidence.

Survival
Since death does not follow immediately on crucifixion, survival after a short period of crucifixion is possible, as in the case of those who choose each year as a devotional practice to be non-lethally crucified.

There is an ancient record of one person who survived a crucifixion that was intended to be lethal, but was interrupted. Josephus recounts: "I saw many captives crucified, and remembered three of them as my former acquaintances. I was very sorry at this in my mind, and went with tears in my eyes to Titus, and told him of them; so he immediately commanded them to be taken down, and to have the greatest care taken of them, in order to their recovery; yet two of them died under the physician's hands, while the third recovered." Josephus gives no details of the method or duration of the crucifixion of his three friends before their reprieve.

History and religious texts

Pre-Roman states
Crucifixion (or impalement), in one form or another, was used by Persians, Carthaginians, and among the Greeks, the Macedonians.

The Greeks were generally opposed to performing crucifixions. However, in his Histories, ix.120–122, the Greek writer Herodotus describes the execution of a Persian general at the hands of Athenians in about 479 BC: "They nailed him to a plank and hung him up ... this Artayctes who suffered death by crucifixion." The Commentary on Herodotus by How and Wells remarks: "They crucified him with hands and feet stretched out and nailed to cross-pieces; cf. vii.33. This barbarity, unusual on the part of Greeks, may be explained by the enormity of the outrage or by Athenian deference to local feeling."

Some Christian theologians, beginning with Paul of Tarsus writing in Galatians 3:13, have interpreted an allusion to crucifixion in Deuteronomy . This reference is to being hanged from a tree, and may be associated with lynching or traditional hanging. However, Rabbinic law limited capital punishment to just 4 methods of execution: stoning, burning, strangulation, and decapitation, while the passage in Deuteronomy was interpreted as an obligation to hang the corpse on a tree as a form of deterrence. The fragmentary Aramaic Testament of Levi (DSS 4Q541) interprets in column 6: "God ... (partially legible)-will set ... right errors. ... (partially legible)-He will judge ... revealed sins. Investigate and seek and know how Jonah wept. Thus, you shall not destroy the weak by wasting away or by ... (partially legible)-crucifixion ... Let not the nail touch him."

The Jewish king Alexander Jannaeus, king of Judea from 103 BC to 76 BC, crucified 800 rebels, said to be Pharisees, in the middle of Jerusalem.

Alexander the Great is reputed to have crucified 2,000 survivors from his siege of the Phoenician city of Tyre, as well as the doctor who unsuccessfully treated Alexander's lifelong friend Hephaestion. Some historians have also conjectured that Alexander crucified Callisthenes, his official historian and biographer, for objecting to Alexander's adoption of the Persian ceremony of royal adoration.

In Carthage, crucifixion was an established mode of execution, which could even be imposed on generals for suffering a major defeat.

The oldest crucifixion may be a post-mortem one mentioned by Herodotus. Polycrates, the tyrant of Samos, was put to death in 522 BC by Persians, and his dead body was then crucified.

Ancient Rome

History 

The Greek and Latin words corresponding to "crucifixion" applied to many different forms of painful execution, including being impaled on a stake, or affixed to a tree, upright pole (a crux simplex), or to a combination of an upright (in Latin, stipes) and a crossbeam (in Latin, patibulum). Seneca the Younger active in the first century c.e. wrote: "I see crosses there, not just of one kind but made in many different ways: some have their victims with head down to the ground; some impale their private parts; others stretch out their arms on the gibbet".

Crucifixion was generally performed within Ancient Rome as a means to dissuade others from perpetrating similar crimes, with victims sometimes left on display after death as a warning. Crucifixion was intended to provide a death that was particularly slow, painful (hence the term excruciating, literally "out of crucifying"), gruesome, humiliating, and public, using whatever means were most expedient for that goal. Crucifixion methods varied considerably with location and period.

One hypothesis suggested that the Ancient Roman custom of crucifixion may have developed out of a primitive custom of arbori suspendere—hanging on an arbor infelix ("inauspicious tree") dedicated to the gods of the nether world. This hypothesis is rejected by William A. Oldfather, who shows that this form of execution (the supplicium more maiorum, punishment in accordance with the custom of our ancestors) consisted of suspending someone from a tree, not dedicated to any particular gods, and flogging him to death. Tertullian mentions a 1st-century AD case in which trees were used for crucifixion, but Seneca the Younger earlier used the phrase infelix lignum (unfortunate wood) for the transom ("patibulum") or the whole cross. Plautus and Plutarch are the two main sources for accounts of criminals carrying their own patibula to the upright stipes.

Notorious mass crucifixions followed the Third Servile War in 73–71 BC (the slave rebellion under Spartacus), other Roman civil wars in the 2nd and 1st centuries BC. Crassus ordered the crucifixion of 6,000 of Spartacus' followers who had been hunted down and captured after the slave defeat in battle. Josephus says that in the siege that led to the destruction of Jerusalem in AD 70, the Roman soldiers crucified Jewish captives before the walls of Jerusalem and out of anger and hatred amused themselves by nailing them in different positions.

In some cases, the condemned was forced to carry the crossbeam to the place of execution. A whole cross would weigh well over 135 kg (300 lb), but the crossbeam would not be as burdensome, weighing around 45 kg (100 lb). The Roman historian Tacitus records that the city of Rome had a specific place for carrying out executions, situated outside the Esquiline Gate, and had a specific area reserved for the execution of slaves by crucifixion. Upright posts would presumably be fixed permanently in that place, and the crossbeam, with the condemned person perhaps already nailed to it, would then be attached to the post.

The person executed may have been attached to the cross by rope, though nails and other sharp materials are mentioned in a passage by the Judean historian Josephus, where he states that at the Siege of Jerusalem (70), "the soldiers out of rage and hatred, nailed those they caught, one after one way, and another after another, to the crosses, by way of jest". Objects used in the crucifixion of criminals, such as nails, were sought as amulets with perceived medicinal qualities.

While a crucifixion was an execution, it was also a humiliation, by making the condemned as vulnerable as possible. Although artists have traditionally depicted the figure on a cross with a loin cloth or a covering of the genitals, the person being crucified was usually stripped naked. Writings by Seneca the Younger state some victims suffered a stick forced upwards through their groin. Despite its frequent use by the Romans, the horrors of crucifixion did not escape criticism by some eminent Roman orators. Cicero, for example, described crucifixion as "a most cruel and disgusting punishment", and suggested that "the very mention of the cross should be far removed not only from a Roman citizen's body, but from his mind, his eyes, his ears". Elsewhere he says, "It is a crime to bind a Roman citizen; to scourge him is a wickedness; to put him to death is almost parricide. What shall I say of crucifying him? So guilty an action cannot by any possibility be adequately expressed by any name bad enough for it."

Frequently, the legs of the person executed were broken or shattered with an iron club, an act called crurifragium, which was also frequently applied without crucifixion to slaves. This act hastened the death of the person but was also meant to deter those who observed the crucifixion from committing offenses.

Constantine the Great, the first Christian emperor, abolished crucifixion in the Roman Empire in 337 out of veneration for Jesus Christ, its most famous victim.

Society and law 

Crucifixion was intended to be a gruesome spectacle: the most painful and humiliating death imaginable. It was used to punish slaves, pirates, and enemies of the state. It was originally reserved for slaves (hence still called "supplicium servile" by Seneca), and later extended to citizens of the lower classes (humiliores). The victims of crucifixion were stripped naked and put on public display while they were slowly tortured to death so that they would serve as a spectacle and an example.

According to Roman law, if a slave killed his or her master, all of the master's slaves would be crucified as punishment. Both men and women were crucified. Tacitus writes in his Annals that when Lucius Pedanius Secundus was murdered by a slave, some in the Senate tried to prevent the mass crucifixion of four hundred of his slaves because there were so many women and children, but in the end tradition prevailed and they were all executed. Although not conclusive evidence for female crucifixion by itself, the most ancient image of a Roman crucifixion may depict a crucified woman, whether real or imaginary. Crucifixion was such a gruesome and humiliating way to die that the subject was somewhat of a taboo in Roman culture, and few crucifixions were specifically documented. One of the only specific female crucifixions that are documented is that of Ida, a freedwoman (former slave) who was crucified by order of Tiberius.

Process 
Crucifixion was typically carried out by specialized teams, consisting of a commanding centurion and his soldiers. First, the condemned would be stripped naked and scourged. This would cause the person to lose a large amount of blood, and approach a state of shock. The convict then usually had to carry the horizontal beam (patibulum in Latin) to the place of execution, but not necessarily the whole cross.

During the death march, the prisoner, probably still nude after the scourging, would be led through the most crowded streets bearing a titulus – a sign board proclaiming the prisoner's name and crime. Upon arrival at the place of execution, selected to be especially public, the convict would be stripped of any remaining clothing, then nailed to the cross naked. If the crucifixion took place in an established place of execution, the vertical beam (stipes) might be permanently embedded in the ground. In this case, the condemned person's wrists would first be nailed to the patibulum, and then he or she would be hoisted off the ground with ropes to hang from the elevated patibulum while it was fastened to the stipes. Next the feet or ankles would be nailed to the upright stake. The titulus would also be fastened to the cross to notify onlookers of the person's name and crime as they hung on the cross, further maximizing the public impact.

There may have been considerable variation in the position in which prisoners were nailed to their crosses and how their bodies were supported while they died. Seneca the Younger recounts: "I see crosses there, not just of one kind but made in many different ways: some have their victims with head down to the ground; some impale their private parts; others stretch out their arms on the gibbet." One source claims that for Jews (apparently not for others), a man would be crucified with his back to the cross as is traditionally depicted, while a woman would be nailed facing her cross, probably with her back to onlookers, or at least with the stipes providing some semblance of modesty if viewed from the front. Such concessions were "unique" and not made outside a Jewish context. Several sources mention some sort of seat fastened to the stipes to help support the person's body, thereby prolonging the person's suffering and humiliation by preventing the asphyxiation caused by hanging without support. Justin Martyr calls the seat a cornu, or "horn," leading some scholars to believe it may have had a pointed shape designed to torment the crucified person. This would be consistent with Seneca's observation of victims with their private parts impaled.

In Roman-style crucifixion, the condemned could take up to a few days to die, but death was sometimes hastened by human action. "The attending Roman guards could leave the site only after the victim had died, and were known to precipitate death by means of deliberate fracturing of the tibia and/or fibula, spear stab wounds into the heart, sharp blows to the front of the chest, or a smoking fire built at the foot of the cross to asphyxiate the victim." The Romans sometimes broke the prisoner's legs to hasten death and usually forbade burial. On the other hand, the person was often deliberately kept alive as long as possible to prolong their suffering and humiliation, so as to provide the maximum deterrent effect. Corpses of the crucified were typically left on the crosses to decompose and be eaten by animals.

In Islam

Islam spread in a region where many societies, including the Persian and Roman empires, had used crucifixion to punish traitors, rebels, robbers and criminal slaves. The Qur'an refers to crucifixion in six passages, of which the most significant for later legal developments is verse 5:33:

The corpus of hadith provides contradictory statements about the first use of crucifixion under Islamic rule, attributing it variously to Muhammad himself (for murder and robbery of a shepherd) or to the second caliph Umar (applied to two slaves who murdered their mistress). Classical Islamic jurisprudence applies the verse 5:33 chiefly to highway robbers, as a hadd (scripturally prescribed) punishment. The preference for crucifixion over the other punishments mentioned in the verse or for their combination (which Sadakat Kadri has called "Islam's equivalent of the hanging, drawing and quartering that medieval Europeans inflicted on traitors") is subject to "complex and contested rules" in classical jurisprudence. Most scholars required crucifixion for highway robbery combined with murder, while others allowed execution by other methods for this scenario. The main methods of crucifixion are:

 Exposure of the culprit's body after execution by another method, ascribed to "most scholars" and in particular to Ibn Hanbal and Al-Shafi'i; or Hanbalis and Shafi'is.
 Crucifying the culprit alive, then executing him with a lance thrust or another method, ascribed to Malikis, most Hanafis and most Twelver Shi'is; the majority of the Malikis; Malik, Abu Hanifa, and al-Awza'i; or Malikis, Hanafis, and Shafi'is.
 Crucifying the culprit alive and sparing his life if he survives for three days, ascribed to Shiites.

Most classical jurists limit the period of crucifixion to three days. Crucifixion involves affixing or impaling the body to a beam or a tree trunk. Various minority opinions also prescribed crucifixion as punishment for a number of other crimes. Cases of crucifixion under most of the legally prescribed categories have been recorded in the history of Islam, and prolonged exposure of crucified bodies was especially common for political and religious opponents.

Japan

Crucifixion was introduced into Japan during the Sengoku period (1467–1573), after a 350-year period with no capital punishment. It is believed to have been suggested to the Japanese by the introduction of Christianity into the region, although similar types of punishment had been used as early as the Kamakura period. Several related crucifixion techniques were used. Petra Schmidt, in "Capital Punishment in Japan", writes:

In 1597 twenty-six Christian Martyrs were nailed to crosses at Nagasaki, Japan. Among those executed were Saints Paulo Miki, Philip of Jesus and Pedro Bautista, a Spanish Franciscan who had worked about ten years in the Philippines. The executions marked the beginning of a long history of persecution of Christianity in Japan, which continued until its decriminalization in 1871.

Crucifixion was used as a punishment for prisoners of war during World War II. Ringer Edwards, an Australian prisoner of war, was crucified for killing cattle, along with two others. He survived 63 hours before being let down.

Burma
In Burma, crucifixion was a central element in several execution rituals. Felix Carey, a missionary in Burma from 1806 to 1812, wrote the following:

Europe

During World War I, there were persistent rumors that German soldiers had crucified a Canadian soldier on a tree or barn door with bayonets or combat knives. The event was initially reported in 1915 by Private George Barrie of the 1st Canadian Division. Two investigations, one a post-war official investigation, and the other an independent investigation by the Canadian Broadcasting Corporation, concluded that there was no evidence to support the story. However, British documentary maker Iain Overton in 2001 published an article claiming that the story was true, identifying the soldier as Harry Band. Overton's article was the basis for a 2002 episode of the Channel 4 documentary show Secret History.

It has been reported that crucifixion was used in several cases against the German civil population of East Prussia when it was occupied by Soviet forces at the end of the Second World War.

Archaeological evidence

Although the Roman historians Josephus and Appian refer to the crucifixion of thousands of Jews by the Romans, there are few actual archaeological remains. An exception is the crucified body of a Jew dating back to the first century CE which was discovered at Givat HaMivtar, Jerusalem in 1968. The remains were found accidentally in an ossuary with the crucified man's name on it, 'Jehohanan, the son of Hagakol'. Nicu Haas, from the Hebrew University Medical School, examined the ossuary and discovered that it contained a heel bone with a nail driven through its side, indicating that the man had been crucified. The position of the nail relative to the bone suggests the feet had been nailed to the cross from their side, not from their front; various opinions have been proposed as to whether they were both nailed together to the front of the cross or one on the left side, one on the right side. The point of the nail had olive wood fragments on it indicating that he was crucified on a cross made of olive wood or on an olive tree.

Additionally, a piece of acacia wood was located between the bones and the head of the nail, presumably to keep the condemned from freeing his foot by sliding it over the nail. His legs were found broken, possibly to hasten his death. It is thought that because in earlier Roman times iron was valuable, the nails were removed from the dead body to conserve costs. According to Haas, this could help to explain why only one nail has been found, as the tip of the nail in question was bent in such a way that it could not be removed. Haas had also identified a scratch on the inner surface of the right radius bone of the forearm, close to the wrist. He deduced from the form of the scratch, as well as from the intact wrist bones, that a nail had been driven into the forearm at that position.

Many of Haas' findings have, however, been challenged. For instance, it was subsequently determined that the scratches in the wrist area were non-traumatic – and, therefore, not evidence of crucifixion – while reexamination of the heel bone revealed that the two heels were not nailed together, but rather separately to either side of the upright post of the cross.

In 2007, a possible case of a crucified body, with a round hole in a heel bone, possibly caused by a nail, was discovered in the Po Valley near Rovigo, in northern Italy.
In 2017 part of a crucified body, with a nail in the heel, was additionally discovered at Fenstanton in the United Kingdom. Further studies suggested that the remains may be those of a slave, because at that time crucifixion was banned in Roman law for citizens, although not necessarily for slaves.

Modern use

Legal execution in Islamic states
Crucifixion is still used as a rare method of execution in Saudi Arabia. The punishment of crucifixion (șalb) imposed in Islamic law is variously interpreted as exposure of the body after execution, crucifixion followed by stabbing in the chest, or crucifixion for three days, survivors of which are allowed to live.

Several people have been subjected to crucifixion in Saudi Arabia in the 2000s, although on occasion they were first beheaded and then crucified. In March 2013, a robber was set to be executed by being crucified for three days. However, the method was changed to death by firing squad. The Saudi Press Agency reported that the body of another individual was crucified after his execution in April 2019 as part of a crackdown on charges of terrorism.

Ali Mohammed Baqir al-Nimr was arrested in 2012 when he was 17 years old for taking part in an anti-government protests in Saudi Arabia during the Arab Spring. In May 2014, Ali al-Nimr was sentenced to be publicly beheaded and crucified.

Theoretically, crucifixion is still one of the Hadd punishments in Iran. If a crucified person were to survive three days of crucifixion, that person would be allowed to live. Execution by hanging is described as follows: "In execution by hanging, the prisoner will be hung on a hanging truss which should look like a cross, while his (her) back is toward the cross, and (s)he faces the direction of Mecca [in Saudi Arabia], and his (her) legs are vertical and distant from the ground."

Sudan's penal code, based upon the government's interpretation of shari'a, includes execution followed by crucifixion as a penalty. When, in 2002, 88 people were sentenced to death for crimes relating to murder, armed robbery, and participating in ethnic clashes, Amnesty International wrote that they could be executed by either hanging or crucifixion.

In 1997, the Ministry of Justice in the United Arab Emirates issued a statement that a court had sentenced two murderers to be crucified, to be followed by their executions the next day. A Ministry of Justice official later stated that the crucifixion sentence should be considered cancelled. The crucifixions were not carried out, and the convicts were instead executed by firing squad.

Jihadism
On 5 February 2015, the United Nations Committee on the Rights of the Child (CRC) reported that the Islamic State of Iraq and the Levant (ISIL) had committed "several cases of mass executions of boys, as well as reports of beheadings, crucifixions of children and burying children alive".

On 30 April 2014, a total of seven public executions were carried out in Raqqa, northern Syria. The pictures, originally posted to Twitter by a student at Oxford University, were retweeted by a Twitter account owned by a known member of the Islamic State of Iraq and the Levant (ISIL) causing major media outlets to incorrectly attribute the origin of the post to the militant group. In most of these cases of crucifixion the victims are shot first then their bodies are displayed but there have also been reports of crucifixion preceding shootings or decapitations as well as a case where a man was said to have been "crucified alive for eight hours" with no indication of whether he died.

Other incidents
The human rights group Karen Women Organization documented a case of Tatmadaw forces crucifying several Karen villagers in 2000 in the Dooplaya District in Burma's Kayin State.

On 22 January 2014, Dmytro Bulatov, an anti-government activist and member of AutoMaidan, claimed to have been kidnapped by unknown persons "speaking in Russian accents" and tortured for a week. His captors kept him in the dark, beat him, cut off a piece of his ear, and nailed him to a cross. His captors ultimately left him in a forest outside Kyiv after forcing him to confess to being an American spy and accepting money from the US Embassy in Ukraine to organize protests against then-President Viktor Yanukovych. Bulatov said he believed Russian secret services were responsible.

In culture and arts

As a devotional practice

The Catholic Church frowns upon self-crucifixion as a form of devotion: "Penitential practices leading to self-crucifixion with nails are not to be encouraged." Despite this, the practice persists in the Philippines, where some Catholics are voluntarily, non-lethally crucified for a limited time on Good Friday to imitate the sufferings of Christ. Pre-sterilised nails are driven through the palm of the hand between the bones, while there is a footrest to which the feet are nailed. Rolando del Campo, a carpenter in Pampanga, vowed to be crucified every Good Friday for 15 years if God would carry his wife through a difficult childbirth, while in San Pedro Cutud, Ruben Enaje has been crucified 33 times. The Filipino Catholic Church has repeatedly voiced disapproval of crucifixions and self-flagellation, while the government has noted that it cannot deter devotees. The Department of Health recommends that participants in the rites should have tetanus shots and that the nails used should be sterilized.

In other cases, a crucifixion is only simulated within a passion play, as in the ceremonial re-enactment that has been performed yearly in the town of Iztapalapa, on the outskirts of Mexico City, since 1833, and in the more famous Oberammergau Passion Play. Also, since at least the mid-19th century, a group of flagellants in New Mexico, called Hermanos de Luz ("Brothers of Light"), have annually conducted reenactments of Christ's crucifixion during Holy Week, in which a penitent is tied—but not nailed—to a cross.

In a reported case from July 1805 a man named Mattio Lovat attempted to crucify himself at a public street in Venice, Italy. The attempt was unsuccessful, and he was sent to an asylum, where he died a year later.

Notable crucifixions

The rebel slaves of the Third Servile War: Between 73 BC and 71 BC a band of slaves, eventually numbering about 120,000, under the (at least partial) leadership of Spartacus were in open revolt against the Roman republic. The rebellion was eventually crushed and, while Spartacus himself most likely died in the final battle of the revolt, approximately 6,000 of his followers were crucified along the 200 km Appian Way between Capua and Rome as a warning to any other would-be rebels.
 Jehohanan: Jewish man who was crucified around the same time as Jesus of Nazareth and it is widely accepted that his ankles were nailed to the side of the stipes of the cross 
Jesus of Nazareth: his death by crucifixion under Pontius Pilate (c. AD 30 or 33), recounted in the four 1st-century canonical Gospels, is referred to repeatedly as something well known in the earlier letters of Saint Paul, for instance, five times in his First Letter to the Corinthians, written in 57 AD (1:13, 1:18, 1:23, 2:2, 2:8). Pilate was the Roman governor of Judaea province at the time, and he is explicitly linked with the condemnation of Jesus not only by the Gospels but also by Tacitus (see Responsibility for the death of Jesus for details). The civil charge was a claim to be King of the Jews.
Saint Peter: Christian apostle, who according to tradition was crucified upside-down at his own request (hence the Cross of Saint Peter), because he did not feel worthy enough to die the same way as Jesus.
Saint Andrew: Christian apostle and Saint Peter's brother, who is traditionally said to have been crucified on an X-shaped cross (hence the Saint Andrew's Cross).
Simeon of Jerusalem: second Bishop of Jerusalem, crucified in either 106 or 107 AD.
Mani: the founder of Manicheanism, he was depicted by followers as having died by crucifixion in 274 AD.
Eulalia of Barcelona was venerated as a saint. According to her hagiography, she was stripped naked, tortured, and ultimately crucified on an X-shaped cross.
Wilgefortis was venerated as a saint and represented as a crucified woman, however her legend comes from a misinterpretation of a full-clothed crucifix known as the Volto Santo of Lucca.
The 26 Martyrs of Japan: Japanese martyrs who were crucified and impaled with spears.

See also
Breaking wheel
Crucifixion darkness
Crucifixion of Jesus
List of methods of capital punishment
Torture
Tropaion

Notes

References

External links

"Forensic and Clinical Knowledge of the Practice of Crucifixion" by Frederick Zugibe
Jesus's death on the cross, from a medical perspective

"Dishonour, Degradation and Display: Crucifixion in the Roman World" by Philip Hughes
Jewish Encyclopedia: Crucifixion
Crucifixion of Joachim of Nizhny-Novgorod

 
Capital punishment
Execution methods
Torture
Human positions
Public executions
Crosses by function